Auditorium Shores station is a planned underground light rail station in Austin Texas. It is the Orange Line's southernmost station in the Downtown Transit Tunnel. The station was initially planned to be on the surface, but engineering challenges prompted Capital Metro to construct the station underground.

References

Future Capital MetroRail stations
Buildings and structures in Austin, Texas
Proposed railway stations in the United States
Railway stations scheduled to open in 2029
Railway stations located underground in the United States